Smelt may refer to:

 Smelting, chemical process
 The common name of various fish:
 Smelt (fish), a family of small fish, Osmeridae
 Australian smelt in the family Retropinnidae and species Retropinna semoni
 Big-scale sand smelt Atherina boyeri
 Deep-sea smelts in the family Bathylagidae
 Great Lakes smelts (North American) in the family Osmeridae and genera Allosmerus (also called whitebait smelt), Hypomesus, Mallotus, Osmerus, Spirinchus and Thaleichthys
 Herring smelt of the family Argentinidae
 Mediterranean sand smelt, Atherina hepsetus
 New Zealand smelt in the family Retropinnidae and species Retropinna retropinna
 some species in  Silverside family Atherinidae
 Smelt-whitings in the family Sillaginidae
 Whitebait smelts (North American) in the family Osmeridae and genera: Allosmerus, Hypomesus and Mallotus

See also 
 
 
 Melt (disambiguation)
 Smell (disambiguation)